The commune of Bugendana is a commune of Gitega Province in central Burundi. The capital lies at Bugendana. In 2007, DGHER electrified two rural villages in the commune.

References

Communes of Burundi
Gitega Province